The Bulgarian Sailing Federation is the national governing body for the sport of sailing in Bulgaria, recognised by the International Sailing Federation.

Famous Sailors
See :Category:Bulgarian sailors

Olympic sailing
See :Category:Olympic sailors of Bulgaria

Yacht Clubs
See :Category:Yacht clubs in Bulgaria

References

External links
 Official website

Bulgaria
Sailing
1958 establishments in Bulgaria